Fox Comedy (known until November 18, 2015, as FX) is a Portuguese  pay television channel that broadcasts comedy series and films, owned by Fox Networks Group. Programs are mostly imported, mainly from the United States, occasionally also Canada and the United Kingdom. The channel has become the home for primarily Fox's animated adult shows such as The Simpsons and Family Guy.

Current programs

2 Broke Girls
A Criada Malcriada
Abbott Elementary
American Dad! (formerly on Fox)
American Housewife
Atlanta
Baby Daddy
Black-ish
Brooklyn Nine-Nine
Bob's Burgers (formerly on RTP2)
Cristela
Episodes
Family Guy (formerly on Fox, SIC Radical and RTP2)
Fresh Off the Boat
Friends
How I Met Your Mother (formerly on Fox and Fox Life)
Kevin Can Wait
Last Man Standing (formerly on Fox Life)
Life in Pieces
Malcolm in the Middle (formerly on Fox and SIC Radical)
Mike & Molly (formerly on AXN White)
Modern Family (formerly on Fox Life and also on TVI)
Mom (formerly on RTP2)
New Girl (formerly on Fox Life and also on TVI)
Porta dos Fundos (formerly on Fox)
Raising Hope (formerly on Fox Life)
Son of Zorn
Speechless
Superstore
The Big Bang Theory (formerly on RTP2, Animax and AXN White)
The Goldbergs
The Grinder
The Middle (formerly on Fox Life and RTP2)
The Mick
The Mindy Project
The Neighbors
The Simpsons (formerly on  Canal 1/RTP1, RTP2, RTP Açores, RTP Madeira and Fox)
Wipeout (USA)
One Day at a Time
Two and a Half Men (formerly on RTP1, RTP2/2: and AXN)

Former programs

References

External links

See also 
 FX (TV Channel)
 Fox Comedy

Disney television networks
Fox Networks Group
Portuguese-language television stations
Television channels and stations established in 2007
Television stations in Portugal